This article  lists the heads of state of Sudan since the country's independence in 1956.

History of the office
Since independence was proclaimed on 2 January 1956, six individuals (and three multi-member sovereignty councils) have served as head of state of Sudan, currently under the title President of the Republic of the Sudan. Prior to independence, Sudan was governed as a condominium by Egypt and the United Kingdom, under the name Anglo-Egyptian Sudan. As such, executive power was vested in a dyarchy consisting of both countries' heads of state – at the time of independence, the Queen of the United Kingdom (Elizabeth II) and the Egyptian Revolutionary Command Council (headed by Gamal Abdel Nasser). Immediately following independence, the role of head of state was filled by a five-member Sovereignty Council, with rival nationalist factions unable to agree on a single candidate. In November 1958, General Ibrahim Abboud led a military coup d'état, assuming the role of head of state as Chairman of the Supreme Council. Assuming the title of president in 1964, he resigned later that year due to general discontent around the rule of the military regime. Abboud was succeeded by a senior civil servant, Sirr Al-Khatim Al-Khalifa, who served as acting president for 18 days before transferring executive authority to a Committee of Sovereignty.

Ismail al-Azhari, the leader of the National Unionist Party, was made president in July 1965; he ruled with limited power until he was deposed in a 1969 military coup. The military officers responsible for the coup established the National Revolutionary Command Council, chaired by Jaafar Nimeiry. Nimeiry, the leader of the newly formed Sudanese Socialist Union, assumed the position of president in 1971, and subsequently established a one-party state, which existed until 1985, when a group of military officers overthrew his government and established the 1985 Transitional Military Council, led by Field Marshal Abdel Rahman Swar al-Dahab. Ahmed al-Mirghani succeeded to the relatively powerless position of Chairman of the Supreme Council in 1986, after multi-party election held that year. He was deposed in a 1989 military coup led by Lieutenant-General Omar al-Bashir. Al-Bashir served as head of state, under the title of Chairman of the Revolutionary Command Council for National Salvation from 1989 to 1993 and as president from 1993 to 2019 (and from 1996 as the leader of the National Congress Party). Al-Bashir was removed from power by the Sudanese Armed Forces on 11 April 2019, amid the Sudanese Revolution after holding the office for nearly 30 years. Lieutenant-General Ahmed Awad Ibn Auf took control of Sudan without becoming head of state, established the 2019 Transitional Military Council, but resigned the following day in favor of Lieutenant-General Abdel Fattah al-Burhan. The Transitional Military Council was replaced with the Sovereignty Council on 20 August 2019, under the chairmanship of al-Burhan. The Sovereignty Council, an 11-member civilian-military collective head of state, is designed to lead the country for 39 months in the transition to democracy, which is supposed to end with the next general election. The Sovereignty Council was dissolved by al-Burhan on 25 October 2021, following a coup d'état.

Titles of heads of state
 1956–1958: Sovereignty Council
 1958–1964: Chairman of the Supreme Council
 1964: President
 1964–1965: Committees of Sovereignty
 1965–1969: Chairman of the Sovereignty Council
 1969–1971: Chairman of the National Revolutionary Command Council
 1971–1985: President
 1985: Commander-in-Chief
 1985–1986: Chairman of the Transitional Military Council
 1986–1989: Chairman of the Supreme Council
 1989–1993: Chairman of the Revolutionary Command Council for National Salvation
 1993–2019: President
 2019: Chairman of the Transitional Military Council
 2019–2021: Sovereignty Council
 2021–present: Chairman of the Transitional Sovereignty Council

Heads of state of Sudan (1956–present)

(Dates in italics indicate de facto continuation of office)

Timeline

Incoming election

Notes

See also
 Politics of Sudan
 List of governors of pre-independence Sudan
 Vice President of Sudan
 List of heads of government of Sudan
 Lists of office-holders
 List of current heads of state and government

References

External links
 Official website of the President of Sudan
 World Statesmen – Sudan

Government of Sudan
History of Sudan
Sudan
 
1956 establishments in Sudan
Heads of state
Heads of state